Doddakallasandra is a metro station on the Green Line of the Namma Metro. This station was opened on 21 January 2021 to the public. The station was inaugurated along with five other stations, as a part of the Green Line extension.

Station layout

Entry/Exits
There are 2 Entry/Exit points – A and B. Commuters can use either of the points for their travel.

 Entry/Exit point A: Towards Doddakallasandra side
 Entry/Exit point B: Towards Mantri Arena Mall side

See also

Bangalore
Green Line
List of Namma Metro stations
Transport in Karnataka
List of metro systems
List of rapid transit systems in India

References

Namma Metro stations
